The 1982–83 County Championship was the 41st season of the Liga IV, the fourth tier of the Romanian football league system. The champions of each county association play against one from a neighboring county in a play-off  to gain promotion to Divizia C.

Promotion play-off 
Teams promoted to Divizia C without a play-off matches as teams from less represented counties in the third division.

 (SB) Unirea Ocna Sibiului
 (SJ) Minerul Sărmășag
 (VL) Recolta Mihăești
 (VS) Inter Vaslui

 (BT) Chimia Zalău
 (GR) Argeșul 30 Decembrie
 (CV) Metalul Târgu Secuiesc

 The municipality of Bucharest did not enter a team in the play-offs.

The matches was played on 10 and 17 July 1983.

County leagues

Arad County 
Seria A

Seria B

Championship final 
The matches was played on 4 and 8 June 1980.

Chimia Arad won the 1982–83 Arad County Championship and qualify for promotion play-off in Divizia C.

Hunedoara County 
 Valea Jiului Series

 Valea Mureșului Series

Championship tie-breaker 
Mecanica Orăștie and Minerul Deva played a play-off match in order to determine the winner of Valea Mureșului Series. The match tie-breaker was played on 8 June 1983 at CFR Stadium in Simeria.

|}
Championship final 
The matches was played on 15, 19 and 23 June 1983.

Mecanica Orăștie won the 1982–83 Hunedoara County Championship and qualify for promotion play-off in Divizia C.

Maramureș County

See also 

 1982–83 Divizia A
 1982–83 Divizia B
 1982–83 Divizia C
 1982–83 Cupa României

References

External links
 

Liga IV seasons
4
Romania